Antalis is a genus of tusk shells, marine scaphopod mollusks.

Species
Species within the genus Antalis include:

 Antalis agilis (M. Sars in G.O. Sars, 1872)
 Antalis albatrossae Scarabino, 2008
 Antalis alis Scarabino, 2008
 Antalis antillaris (d'Orbigny, 1853)
 Antalis ariannae Caprotti, 2015
 Antalis bartletti (Henderson, 1920)
 Antalis berryi (A. G. Smith & Gordon, 1948)
 Antalis boucheti Scarabino, 1995
 Antalis caprottii Martínez-Ortí & Cádiz, 2012
 Antalis cerata (Dall, 1881)
 Antalis circumcincta (R. B. Watson, 1879)
 Antalis dentalis (Linnaeus, 1758)
 Antalis diarrhox (R. B. Watson, 1879)
 Antalis entalis (Linnaeus, 1758)
 Antalis gardineri (Melvill, 1909)
 Antalis glaucarena (Dell, 1953)
 Antalis guillei Scarabino, 1995
 Antalis inaequicostata (Dautzenberg, 1891)
 Antalis inflexa (G. B. Sowerby III, 1903)
 Antalis intesi (Nicklès, 1979)
 Antalis longitrorsa (Reeve, 1842)
 Antalis maestratii Scarabino, 2008
 Antalis marukawai (Otuka, 1933)
 Antalis nana (Hutton, 1873)
 Antalis novemcostata (Lamarck, 1818)
 Antalis occidentalis (Stimpson, 1851)
 Antalis panorma (Chenu, 1843)
 Antalis perinvoluta (Ludbrook, 1954)
 Antalis phanea (Dall, 1895)
 Antalis pilsbryi (Rehder, 1942)
 Antalis porcata (Gould, 1859)
 Antalis pretiosa (Sowerby, 1860)
 Antalis rossati (Caprotti, 1966)
 Antalis senegalensis (Dautzenberg, 1891)
 Antalis suteri (Emerson, 1954)
 Antalis taphria (Dall, 1889)
 Antalis tibana (Nomura, 1940)
 Antalis tubulata (Henderson, 1920)
 Antalis usitata (E. A. Smith, 1894)
 Antalis valdiviae (Plate, 1908)
 Antalis vulgaris (da Costa, 1778)
 Antalis weinkauffi (Dunker, 1877)

Extinct species
Antalis nanaimoense (extinct/fossil)
Antalis cooprei (extinct/fossil)
Taxon inquirendum
 Antalis aculeata (Sowerby, 1860)
Species brought into synonymy
 Antalis boissevainae Palmer, 1974 accepted as Antalis tibana (Nomura, 1940)
 Antalis callithrix (Dall, 1889) accepted as Pertusiconcha callithrix (Dall, 1889) (currently placed in genus Pertusiconcha)
 Antalis disparile (d'Orbigny, 1853) accepted as Paradentalium disparile (d'Orbigny, 1853)
 Antalis entale Linnaeus, 1758 accepted as Antalis entalis (Linnaeus, 1758) (wrong grammatical agreement of epithet)
 Antalis infracta (Odhner, 1931) accepted as Paradentalium infractum (Odhner, 1931)
 Antalis occidentale (Stimpson, 1851) accepted as Antalis occidentalis (Stimpson, 1851)
 Antalis vulgare (da Costa, 1778) accepted as Antalis vulgaris (da Costa, 1778) (Spelling variation)

References

External links
 Da Costa, Mendes E. (1778). Historia naturalis testaceorum Britanniæ, or, the British conchology; containing the descriptions and other particulars of natural history of the shells of Great Britain and Ireland: illustrated with figures. In English and French. - Historia naturalis testaceorum Britanniæ, ou, la conchologie Britannique; contenant les descriptions & autres particularités d'histoire naturelle des coquilles de la Grande Bretagne & de l'Irlande: avec figures en taille douce. En anglois & françois., i-xii, 1-254, i-vii, [1], Pl. I-XVII. London. (Millan, White, Emsley & Robson)., available online at https://www.biodiversitylibrary.org/item/47268#page/7/mode/1up page(s): 24
 Steiner, G.; Kabat, A. R. (2001). Catalogue of supraspecific taxa of Scaphopoda (Mollusca). Zoosystema. 23(3): 433-460

Dentaliidae
Mollusc genera